Jorge Walter Theiler (born 12 May 1964) is an Argentine former professional footballer who played as a defender; he won the Primera División Argentina in 1987–88 with Newell's Old Boys.

Theiler came through the youth team of Newell's Old Boys to make his debut in 1983. He played in the 1983 FIFA World Youth Championship where the Argentina Under-20 team reached the final but lost to Brazil. He also played for the full national team and was part of the squad for Copa América 1987. Newell's won the 1987-88 Primera División.

In 1990 Theiler joined River Plate bet he never established himself in the first team, he then had a spell with St Gallen of Switzerland before returning to Argentina to join San Lorenzo de Almagro. In 1993, he returned to Newell's Old Boys.

After retiring as a player he went on to pursue a career in coaching. After working with the youth teams of River Plate and Newell's Old Boys he became the manager of Libertad of Paraguay in 2004 for three games. In 2005, he had a brief spell as the manager of Instituto de Córdoba. In 2008, he was the manager of the Argentina Under-15 football team for the South American Under-15 Football Championship.

Honours
Newell's Old Boys
Primera División Argentina: 1987–88

References

External links

Jorge Theiler at BDFA.com.ar 
Jorge Theiler – Managerial statistics in the Argentine Primera at Fútbol XXI 

1964 births
Living people
People from Caseros Department
Argentine footballers
Argentina youth international footballers
Argentina under-20 international footballers
Argentina international footballers
1987 Copa América players
Association football defenders
Newell's Old Boys footballers
Club Atlético River Plate footballers
San Lorenzo de Almagro footballers
FC St. Gallen players
Argentine football managers
Instituto managers
Argentine expatriate footballers
Expatriate footballers in Switzerland
Argentine people of German descent
Argentine Primera División players
Atlanta United FC non-playing staff
Sportspeople from Santa Fe Province
Pan American Games bronze medalists for Argentina
Medalists at the 1987 Pan American Games
Footballers at the 1987 Pan American Games
Pan American Games medalists in football